Persuasion is a 2022 American romantic drama film directed by Carrie Cracknell from a screenplay by Ron Bass and Alice Victoria Winslow, based on the novel of the same name by Jane Austen. The film stars Dakota Johnson, Cosmo Jarvis, Nikki Amuka-Bird, Mia McKenna-Bruce, Richard E. Grant, and Henry Golding.

Persuasion was released in the United States on July 8, 2022, before its streaming release on July 15, 2022, by Netflix. The film received generally negative reviews criticizing the film's modernization of the source material and the main protagonist Anne Elliott breaking the fourth wall by interacting with the audience.

Plot
TBA

Cast

Production
In April 2021, it was announced Dakota Johnson had joined the cast of the film, with Carrie Cracknell directing from a screenplay by Ron Bass and Alice Victoria Winslow, based on the novel of the same name by Jane Austen, with Netflix set to distribute. In May 2021, Henry Golding, Cosmo Jarvis, Suki Waterhouse, Richard E. Grant, Nikki Amuka-Bird, Ben Bailey Smith, Izuka Hoyle, Mia McKenna-Bruce, and Nia Towle joined the cast of the film. In June 2021, Edward Bluemel, Lydia Rose Bewley, and Yolanda Kettle joined the cast of the film.

Principal photography began in May 2021.

Reception 
 On Metacritic, the film has a weighted average score of 42 out of 100 based on 37 critics, indicating mixed or average reviews.

Variety 's Peter Debruge found Carrie Cracknell to have "gone and done a strange thing with the book", by trying to "modernize it, borrowing heavily from Fleabag with its fourth-wall-breaking gimmicks", while "casting a free-spirited, fully liberated American star, Dakota Johnson, as Anne — all of which strips the novel of its core tension." Christy Lemire from the Roger Ebert website found Dakota Johnson offering in the film "a taste of her under-appreciated comic timing", though she claims "it's impossible to care about whether Anne ends up with Frederick Wentworth because, as played by Cosmo Jarvis, he is so stiff and uncharismatic." The Guardian'''s Stuart Heritage wrote that the "attempt to modernize the classic novel has led to a disaster of anachronistic dialogue and annoyingly wry glances at the camera," while Vox critic Constance Grady found the film an "absolute disaster." The Spectator'' went so far as to proclaim in its review that "everyone involved should be in prison."

References

External links
 
 

2022 films
2022 directorial debut films
2022 romantic drama films
2020s American films
2020s English-language films
American romantic drama films
English-language Netflix original films
Films based on Persuasion (novel)
Media Rights Capital films